3 mm scale, also known as 3 mm finescale, is a model railway scale of 3 mm: 1 ft used for British prototypes. Introduced as British TT gauge, it sits approximately halfway between British N gauge and OO gauge, but is not as popular as either and there is no longer any mass manufacturer ready-to-run support. When TT gauge model railways were developed for British prototypes, in order to fit the small British prototypes, the scale was enlarged but without altering the 12mm gauge. The result, British TT gauge, is too narrow. This led to the development of  gauge 3mm finescale. Thus two finescale standards were developed. By far the more common of these is 14.2 mm gauge track, which is accurate. Some modellers choose to use slightly narrower 13.5 mm track due to the necessary oversize motion of outside-cylindered steam locomotives.

British TT, also known as TT3, was pioneered by Triang Railways as ready-to-run models.

Other gauges are also used to model other prototypes (Irish broad gauge, Brunel gauge).  For narrow gauges, N gauge 9 mm track represents  gauge; Z gauge  track represents to  gauge.

The 3mm Society caters for all modellers of 3 mm scale.

See also
 Rail transport modelling scales
 Model railway scales

References

External links 
 3mm Society
 3mm Supplier